GLASS-z12 (previously known as GLASS-z13) is a Lyman-break galaxy discovered by the Grism Lens-Amplified Survey from Space (GLASS) observing program using the James Webb Space Telescope's NIRCam in July 2022. ALMA observations detected an emission line associated with doubly ionized oxygen (O III) at 258.7 GHz with a significance of 5σ, suggesting that there is very low dust content in GLASS-z12, if not the early universe as well. Also based on oxygen-related measurements, the age of the galaxy is confirmed. 

GLASS-z12 derives its name from the GLASS survey that discovered it and its estimated photometric redshift of approximately z = . GLASS-z12 was initially announced as GLASS-z13 because it was thought to have a higher redshift of z = 13.1. This redshift value was later revised down to z = 12.4 in October 2022, resulting in the renaming of this galaxy.

GLASS-z12 has a light-travel distance (lookback time) of 13.6 billion years. However, due to the expansion of the universe, its present proper distance is 33.2 billion light-years. It was discovered alongside another galaxy, GLASS-z10, comparable to GN-z11, also one of the oldest galaxies discovered.

See also

 CEERS-93316
 Earliest galaxies
 HD1 (galaxy)
 JADES-GS-z13-0
 List of the most distant astronomical objects
 Lyman-break galaxy

References

Galaxies
Sculptor (constellation)
Dwarf galaxies
James Webb Space Telescope